Anice Das (born 31 December 1985 in Mumbai) is a retired Indian-born  Dutch speed skater, specialized in sprint distances.

Professional career
Das made her first appearance at the Dutch single distance championships on 30 December 2005, aged 19. Since then she competed in nearly all Dutch single distance championships and Dutch sprint championships. She has achieved a slow but steady progress in her results, with her best results occurring at the 2017 Dutch championships (3rd place in 500m single distance, 2nd place overall in sprint). In February 2017, she competed at the world single distance championships for the first time. That same month, she competed at the world sprint championships for a second time. She was plagued by illness, including fever, in the week leading up to the event. She did manage to improve her personal best on 1000 meters in both races, finishing 18th overall.

On 28 December 2017, Das won the 500 meter event at the Dutch qualification tournament for the 2018 Olympic Games, beating all expected favorites. On 18 February 2018, she ended in 19th place at the Olympic 500 meter event, after skating in the first run without having an opponent in the other lane.

On 17 March 2020, Das announced her retirement from professional speed skating.

Personal life
Das was born in Mumbai, India and was adopted by a Dutch family as an infant, along with her twin sister.

Personal records 

Source:

Results 

Source:

References

External links
 

1985 births
Living people
Sportspeople from Mumbai
Indian emigrants to the Netherlands
Dutch female speed skaters
Dutch people of Indian descent
Indian adoptees
Twin sportspeople
Speed skaters at the 2018 Winter Olympics
Olympic speed skaters of the Netherlands
20th-century Dutch women
21st-century Dutch women